Khaneqah (also Romanized as Khāneqāh, Khānaqāh, and Khānqāh; also known as Khaneghah and Khanagya) is a village in Shiramin Rural District, Howmeh District, Azarshahr County, East Azerbaijan Province, Iran. At the 2006 census, its population was 1,388, in 370 families.

References 

Populated places in Azarshahr County